Terpsithea is a village in Messenia, southern Greece. It is a settlement of the town Kyparissia with about 90 residents (2011 census). The village is about 500 metres from the Ionian Sea coast, 4 km southwest of Kyparissia. Greek National Road 9 passes through the village. The area is known for the production of watermelons.

References

Populated places in Messenia